Sharon Gail Lee (born December 8, 1953) is an American lawyer and jurist serving as a justice of the Tennessee Supreme Court. She was appointed to that body in October 2008. She was elected by state-wide vote in 2010 and 2014.

Early life and education 
Lee was born in Knoxville, Tennessee and raised in Madisonville. She graduated from Webb School of Knoxville in 1971. After attending Vanderbilt University, she earned a Bachelor of Science degree in business administration from the University of Tennessee in 1975. She continued her education at the University of Tennessee College of Law, graduating in 1978.

Career 
From 1978 to 2004, Lee worked in private practice as an attorney in Madisonville. During her time in private practice, she served as county attorney for Monroe County, Madisonville city judge, and city attorney for Vonore and Madisonville. She is a former Rule 31-listed family mediator.

Before becoming a Tennessee Supreme Court justice, she served on the Tennessee Court of Appeals for the Eastern Section. She was the first woman to serve on the Eastern Section of the Court of Appeals. She was appointed to that position on June 4, 2004. She was subsequently elected to the Court of Appeals in August 2004, then reelected for an eight-year term in August 2006.

She served as chief justice of the Tennessee Supreme Court from September 1, 2014 to August 31, 2016.

Lee announced she will retire on August 31, 2023.

Personal life 
She has two children.

See also 
 List of female state supreme court justices

References

External links

JusticeSharonLee.com: Website for 2014 judicial retention campaign

1953 births
Living people
Chief Justices of the Tennessee Supreme Court
Tennessee lawyers
Tennessee state court judges
Justices of the Tennessee Supreme Court
University of Tennessee alumni
University of Tennessee College of Law alumni
Webb School (Bell Buckle, Tennessee) alumni
Women chief justices of state supreme courts in the United States
People from Knoxville, Tennessee
21st-century American judges
People from Madisonville, Tennessee
21st-century American women judges